Salto de Agua is a town and one of the 119 Municipalities of Chiapas, in southern Mexico.

As of 2010, the municipality had a total population of 57,253, up from 49,300 as of 2005. It covers an area of 1289.2 km2.

Other than the town of Salto de Agua, the municipality had 387 localities, the largest of which (with 2010 populations in parentheses) were: Egipto (1,419), Belisario Domínguez (1,393), San Miguel (1,373), Santa María (1,317), Ignacio Zaragoza (1,303), Río Jordán (1,197), Estrella de Belén (1,151), Jerusalén (1,151), Arroyo Palenque (1,137), and Cenobio Aguilar (La Trinidad) (1,006), classified as rural.

References

Municipalities of Chiapas